Udiramala Subramaniam (2 March 1947 – 28 November 2016) was an Indian cricketer. He played six first-class matches for Kerala between 1970/71 and 1976/77.

See also
 List of Kerala cricketers

References

External links
 

1947 births
2016 deaths
Indian cricketers
Maharashtra cricketers
Cricketers from Thiruvananthapuram